WROK-FM (95.9 MHz, "The Rocket") is a commercial FM radio station licensed to Sebastian, Florida, serving the Space Coast and Treasure Coast areas. The station is owned by Cumulus Media and airs a classic rock format.

WROK-FM has its studios and offices on West Hibiscus Blvd in Melbourne.  The transmitter is off Micco Road near Sebastian.  The station has a construction permit from the Federal Communications Commission to increase its antenna height while slightly decreasing its effective radiated power.  WROK-FM is not associated with WROK (AM) in Rockford, Illinois which is owned by Townsquare Media.

History
The station originally signed on under the call sign WINT-FM, on September 20, 2001, and branded itself 95.9 The Point. At the time, the station featured a big band and adult standards format.  In 2003, WINT changed its call sign to WSJZ, to reflect its new smooth jazz format, and became known as Smooth Jazz 95.9. On April 1, 2004, the station changed to a classic and alternative rock format, calling itself as Pirate 95.9. On September 3, 2009, WSJZ-FM became the new ESPN Radio network affiliate for the Space Coast, featuring a sports radio format, and rebranding itself as ESPN 95.9. Before then, the Space Coast's ESPN Radio affiliate was sister station WINT (now WLZR) on AM 1560 in Melbourne.  That station is now a CBS Sports Radio affiliate.

On April 1, 2015, at 6 p.m., WSJZ changed its format from sports to active rock, branded as "95 Rock", but it still had its former Sports radio logo on the iHeartRadio app.  On February 1, 2016, the station dropped the active rock format, in favor of a classic rock.

On May 31, 2016, WSJZ changed its call letters to WROK-FM.

On June 11, 2018, WROK-FM rebranded as "95.9 The Rocket".

Previous logo

References

External links

ROK-FM
Radio stations established in 2001
2001 establishments in Florida
Classic rock radio stations in the United States
Cumulus Media radio stations